Stenocercus fimbriatus, the western leaf lizard, is a species of lizard in the Tropiduridae family. It is found in the eastern Amazon Basin in Peru, Brazil, and Bolivia.

Stenocercus fimbriatus has cryptic coloration that gives it resemblance of a dead leave. The tail is 1.6–2.2 times SVL. It is oviparous.

References

Stenocercus
Lizards of South America
Reptiles of Bolivia
Reptiles of Brazil
Reptiles of Peru
Reptiles described in 1995
Taxonomy articles created by Polbot